Norwich Township is one of the seventeen townships of Franklin County, Ohio, United States.  The 2010 census found 31,807 people in the township, 3,982 of whom lived in the unincorporated portions of the township.

Geography
Located in the western part of the county, it is composed of several small "islands", separated due to municipal annexations.  These islands border the following townships and cities:
Washington Township - north
Columbus - east
Hilliard - south
Brown Township - west

Most of Norwich Township has been annexed by the cities of Columbus (the county seat of Franklin County), in the south, and Hilliard, in the north.

Name and history

Statewide, the only other Norwich Township is located in Huron County.

Norwich Township was founded in 1813. It was named by Thomas Backus, a prominent early resident and native of Norwich, Connecticut.

Government
The township is governed by a three-member board of trustees, who are elected in November of odd-numbered years to a four-year term beginning on the following January 1. Two are elected in the year after the presidential election and one is elected in the year before it. There is also an elected township fiscal officer, who serves a four-year term beginning on April 1 of the year after the election, which is held in November of the year before the presidential election. Vacancies in the fiscal officership or on the board of trustees are filled by the remaining trustees.

Education
All areas of this township are in the Hilliard City School District.

References

External links
Township website

Townships in Franklin County, Ohio
Townships in Ohio